Renoir is a surname, a phonetic corruption of the French surname, "Renouard."

People with the surname Renoir 
 Pierre-Auguste Renoir (1841–1919), French Impressionist painter
 Pierre Renoir (1885–1952), French actor and son of Pierre-Auguste Renoir
 Jean Renoir (1894–1979), French film director and son of Pierre-Auguste Renoir
 Claude Renoir (1901–1969), French film producer and son of Pierre-Auguste Renoir
 Claude Renoir (1913 (or 1914)–1993), French cinematographer and son of Pierre Renoir, grandson of Pierre-Auguste Renoir
 Sophie Renoir, French actress, daughter of the younger Claude

See also 
 Renoir (crater), a crater on the planet Mercury
 LG KC910 Renoir, a 2008 smartphone
 Renoir Towers in Buenos Aires, Argentina
 Renoir (film), a 2012 French film about the French painter Pierre-Auguste Renoir
 AMD Renoir, an Accelerated Processing Unit (APU) series by AMD

French-language surnames